Liquorland is an Australian liquor store chain, a part of the Coles Group, owned by Wesfarmers until the demerger of Coles Group from Wesfarmers on 21 November 2018. Coles Supermarkets established interests with its expansion into liquor in 1981, with the acquisition of Liquorland and Vintage Cellars. In November 2007 Wesfarmers acquired the Coles Group and as a result the separate Coles division was formed, but was again demerged on 21 November 2018. Liquorland is now one of three liquor brands within Coles Group, along with the larger discount format 1st Choice Liquor and more up-market orientated Vintage Cellars. The Liquorland chain comprised 731 stores as of December 2018.

Most Liquorland outlets are adjacent to or within Coles Supermarkets, except in Queensland, where legislation forbids this practice. In order to maintain a presence, Liquorland operates the Spirit Hotel chain in Queensland, which comprised 89 hotels as of April 2016.

Sub-brands
 Liquorland Express — drive-through and compact Liquorland stores.
 Liquorland Warehouse — a larger, 'big-box'-style format promoting higher-volume purchases.  
 Liquorland Direct — Liquorland's online and mail/phone order business.
 Spirit Hotel Group — operates hotels predominantly in Queensland with a smaller presence in Western Australia, South Australia and New South Wales.

Steamrail Brewing Company 
In January 2013 Coles released a range of beers under the brand Steamrail Brewing Company. The beers, 'Ghost of Eyre' Pale ale, 'Gold Digger' Golden Ale and 'Lucky Amber' Amber Ale, were stocked in First Choice Liquor and Liquorland outlets. All the bottles bear the company name, Steamrail Brewing, and the address of the Coles Supermarkets' headquarters - 800 Toorak Road, East Victoria. Intellectual Property Australia records show that the application for the Steamrail trademark was lodged in October 2013 and that the owner of the trademark is registered as Liquorland. The Steamrail Brewing Company range is brewed at the Asahi plant in Laverton, Victoria.

Liquorland exclusive beer brands also include HAMMER 'N' TONGS, 3 Pub Circus and Lorry Boys.

References

External links
 Liquorland

Coles Group
Alcohol distribution retailers in Australia
Retail companies established in 1981
1981 establishments in Australia
Companies based in Melbourne